E. laeta may refer to:

 Elaphe laeta, a rat snake
 Elimia laeta, an extinct snail
 Embelia laeta, a climbing shrub
 Erora laeta, a gossamer-winged butterfly
 Euphydryas laeta, a brush-footed butterfly
 Eurema laeta, an Indian butterfly
 Euryopis laeta, a tangle-web spider
 Euthrix laeta, a snout moth